Tha (θá)is an Adamawa language of Nigeria.

References

Languages of Nigeria
Bambukic languages